Chrissie Roberts (born December 25, 1975) is an American college basketball coach and the former women's head coach at Eastern Kentucky University (EKU) in Richmond, Kentucky.

Biography
A native of Eminence, Kentucky, Roberts won first team All State honors and was an All-American selection at Eminence High School, and she was picked to play in the Kentucky-Indiana All-Star game. After attending Kentucky for two years, she transferred to EKU. In her two seasons at Eastern, Roberts led the Lady Colonels to two OVC regular season titles, a conference tournament championship, and appearances in the NCAA and WNIT tournaments. During her junior season (1996–97), she nead the nation in three point shooting, winning both the Naismith Memorial Basketball Hall of Fame's Edward S. Steitz Award and the AT&T Long Distance Award. Her shoes, jersey and practice gear were enshrined in the Basketball Hall of Fame in Springfield, Massachusetts. She was named an OVC First Team All-Conference member in both seasons and, in the 1997–98 season, was named OVC Player of the Year and was an Honorable Mention selection on the Kodak All-American Team. She still holds the EKU records for most three point field goals in a season (85 in 1996–97) and highest career three point shooting percentage (47.6%). She was named a member of the EKU Athletics Hall of Fame in 2007. Roberts earned her bachelor's degree in sports supervision in 1998 and her master's degree in sports administration in 1999, both from EKU.

Coaching career
After graduating from Eastern Kentucky, Roberts remained there as a graduate assistant coach while earning her master's degree. She then spent one year as an assistant coach at Tennessee Tech before returning to EKU for two more years as an assistant coach. In 2002, Roberts began a six-year stint as an assistant for the East Carolina Pirates. On June 3, 2008, Roberts was named as the eighth coach in the history of Eastern Kentucky women's basketball program and returned to her alma mater.

Head coaching record
Source:

 OVC 2017-18 Women's Basketball Standings

References

1975 births
Living people
American women's basketball coaches
Basketball players from Kentucky
East Carolina Pirates women's basketball coaches
Eastern Kentucky Colonels women's basketball coaches
Eastern Kentucky University alumni
Kentucky Wildcats women's basketball players
Tennessee Tech Golden Eagles women's basketball coaches
American women's basketball players
Sportswomen from Kentucky